The men's 10,000 metres event at the 2008 African Championships in Athletics was held at the Addis Ababa Stadium on April 30.

Results

References
Results (Archived)

2008 African Championships in Athletics
10,000 metres at the African Championships in Athletics